Exaeretia exornata is a moth in the family Depressariidae. It was described by Shu-Xia Wang and Zhe-Min Zheng in 1998. It is found in China (Heilongjiang).

References

Moths described in 1998
Exaeretia
Moths of Asia